The 1962 Waterford Senior Hurling Championship was the 62nd staging of the Waterford Senior Hurling Championship since its establishment by the Waterford County Board in 1897.

Mount Sion were the defending champions.

Erin's Own won the championship after a 5-07 to 1-04 defeat of Mount Sion in the final. This was their 13th championship title overall and their first title since 1947. It remains their last championship victory.

References

Waterford Senior Hurling Championship
Waterford Senior Hurling Championship